Rynek  is a village in the administrative district of Gmina Grodziczno, within Nowe Miasto County, Warmian-Masurian Voivodeship, in northern Poland.

Notable residents
Hans Finohr (1891 - 1966), actor

References

Rynek